The Brooks Arcade is a historic building in Salt Lake City, Utah. It was built in 1890-1891 as a department store for Julius Brooks, an immigrant from Germany who was one of the first Jewish settlers of Salt Lake City. The building was designed by architects Samuel Cleeton Dallas and William S. Hedges in the Richardsonian Romanesque style.

The building was removed from the National Register of Historic Places.

References

1891 establishments in Utah Territory
Buildings and structures completed in 1891
Buildings and structures in Salt Lake City
Richardsonian Romanesque architecture in Utah